Best of The Corrs is a compilation album by the Irish pop rock band the Corrs, released in Ireland on 19 October 2001. The album consisted of the band's best-selling singles since their first chart appearance in 1995 with "Runaway", up to the Robert John "Mutt" Lange remix of their 2001 single "All the Love in the World", which charted at number twenty-four on the US Adult Contemporary chart. The album also featured the new single "Would You Be Happier?", as well as a new version of the Talk on Corners outtake, "Make You Mine". By the end of 2001, the album had sold over 2.4 million copies worldwide. By 2017, the album has sold 5 million copies.

Track listing

Charts

Weekly charts

Year-end charts

Certifications

References

The Corrs albums
2001 greatest hits albums
Albums produced by Robert John "Mutt" Lange
Albums produced by Mitchell Froom
Albums produced by David Foster
143 Records compilation albums